ZR-75-1 is a human breast cancer cell line.

References

External links                                                              
Cellosaurus entry for ZR-75-1

Cancer research
Human cell lines